Gayo Lues Regency is a regency in the Aceh Special Region of Indonesia. It is located on the island of Sumatra. The regency was created in 2002 under Statute UU 4/2002 from the northern part of Aceh Tenggara (Southeast Aceh Regency). Its capital is Blangkejeren. The regency covers an area of 5,549.91 square kilometres and had a population of 79,560 at the 2010 Census and 99,532 at the 2020 Census; the official estimate as at mid 2021 was 101,102. Along with the Central Aceh Regency and the Bener Meriah Regency, it is home to the Gayo people.

90% of the inhabitants make their living from farming. Products include chili peppers, tobacco, coffee, and lemongrass, fish, rice, candle nut, pataculi, coconut, vanilla, kapok, chocolate, sugarcane, ginger, clove, casslevera, turmeric, and sugar palm. Logging is reportedly a major problem in the regency which is the least populated area of the province with less than 2% of the total population.

Administrative districts 
The regency is divided administratively into eleven districts (kecamatan), listed below with their areas and their populations at the 2010 Census and the 2020 Census, together with the official estimates as at mid 2021. The table also includes the locations of the district administrative centres and the number of villages (rural desa and urban kelurahan) in each district.

See also 

 List of regencies and cities of Indonesia

References 

Regencies of Aceh